The Reverend Jacob Stirewalt was a Lutheran minister serving in Virginia during the mid-19th century. He was born near Salisbury, Rowan County, North Carolina, on Saturday, August 17, 1805, and died at his residence, in New Market, Shenandoah County, Virginia, on Saturday the 21st of August, 1869, at the age of 64 years and 4 days.

Jacob Stirewalt, second son, the third and youngest child of Capt. John and Elizabeth Stirewalt, was baptized in infancy, and later confirmed in the Evangelical Lutheran Church. He was trained and educated by his parents. He gained his theological education by personal study and experience.

Jaocb married Henrietta Henkel, daughter of Elias Henkel, on 8 January 1833 at New Market, Virginia.

Jacob was ordained Deacon, September 14, 1837, and preached his first sermon at Mt. Calvary Church, Page County, Virginia. One of the congregations where he was pastor from 1837-1860. On September 14, 1838, he was ordained Pastor, in Lincoln County, North Carolina.

In the 32 years of his ministry, he preached 3132 sermons, of which 560 were funeral discourses, he confirmed 708 persons, he baptized 1259, and he married 171 couples.

As if to complete the circle of his life, just three months before his death, he preached his last sermon in Page County, Virginia, near the same place, at which he preached his first.

References
Jensson, Jens Christian. “Rev. Jacob Stirewalt.” American Lutheran Biographies : or, Historical Notices of Over Three Hundred and Fifty Leading Men of the American Lutheran Church from its Establishment to the Year 1890 : with a Historical Introduction and Numerous Portrait Engravings. Milwaukee, Wisconsin: 1890, pages 757-760; Digital images. Internet Archive. https://archive.org/ : 2019.

Footnotes

19th-century American Lutheran clergy
1805 births
1869 deaths
People from Rowan County, North Carolina
Religious leaders from Virginia
People from New Market, Virginia
Religious leaders from North Carolina